Vaglen Point (‘Nos Vaglen’ \'nos 'v&-glen\) is the rock-tipped point on the southwest side of the entrance to Chinstrap Cove on the northwest coast of Clarence Island in the South Shetland Islands, Antarctica.

The point is named after the settlements of Vaglen in Northeastern and Southeastern Bulgaria.

Location
British mapping in 1972 and 2009.

Maps
British Antarctic Territory. Scale 1:200000 topographic map. DOS 610 Series, Sheet W 61 54. Directorate of Overseas Surveys, Tolworth, UK, 1972.
South Shetland Islands: Elephant, Clarence and Gibbs Islands. Scale 1:220000 topographic map. UK Antarctic Place-names Committee, 2009.
 Antarctic Digital Database (ADD). Scale 1:250000 topographic map of Antarctica. Scientific Committee on Antarctic Research (SCAR). Since 1993, regularly upgraded and updated.

References
Bulgarian Antarctic Gazetteer. Antarctic Place-names Commission. (details in Bulgarian, basic data in English)
Vaglen Point. SCAR Composite Gazetteer of Antarctica.

External links
 Vaglen Point. Copernix satellite image

Headlands of the South Shetland Islands
Bulgaria and the Antarctic